Michael Jeffery Klukas (born May 2, 1994) is a professional Canadian football wide receiver. He played U Sports football for the Calgary Dinos from 2015 to 2018.

Professional career
Klukas was eligible for the 2016 CFL Draft, but was not drafted by any team and played his fifth year of eligibility at university. He was signed as an undrafted free agent by the Stampeders on December 7, 2017. He spent the 2018 season on the practice roster before being released on September 7, 2018. He was re-signed in the following off-season on December 19, 2018. Klukas played in his first professional game on June 15, 2019, against the Ottawa Redblacks where he also recorded his first career reception.

Klukas signed with the Ottawa Redblacks on July 5, 2021.

References

External links
 Calgary Stampeders bio

1994 births
Living people
Canadian football wide receivers
Calgary Dinos football players
Calgary Stampeders players
Players of Canadian football from Alberta
Canadian football people from Calgary
Ottawa Redblacks players